Kenneth Edward Stumpf (September 28, 1944 – April 23, 2022) was a United States Army soldier and a recipient of the United States military's highest decoration, the Medal of Honor, for his actions in the Vietnam War.

Military career
Stumpf joined the United States Army from Milwaukee, Wisconsin, and by April 25, 1967, was serving as a specialist four in Company C, 1st Battalion, 35th Infantry Regiment, 25th Infantry Division. On that day, during Operation Baker near Đức Phổ in the Republic of Vietnam, Stumpf rescued three wounded comrades despite heavy fire and single-handedly disabled an enemy bunker. He was subsequently promoted to staff sergeant and awarded the Medal of Honor for his actions.

Stumpf reached the rank of sergeant major before retiring from the army.

Medal of Honor citation

Staff Sergeant Stumpf's official Medal of Honor citation reads:

See also

List of Medal of Honor recipients for the Vietnam War

Notes

References

1944 births
2022 deaths
United States Army personnel of the Vietnam War
United States Army Medal of Honor recipients
Recipients of the Legion of Merit
Recipients of the Gallantry Cross (Vietnam)
United States Army soldiers
People from Neenah, Wisconsin
Military personnel from Wisconsin
Vietnam War recipients of the Medal of Honor
Burials at Arlington National Cemetery